is a Japanese former rock and roll musician and airline hijacker currently residing in self-imposed exile in North Korea. In the late 1960s, Wakabayashi was a founding member of the Japanese avant-garde rock band Les Rallizes Dénudés ("The Naked Suitcases"), serving as the band's bassist. Wakabayashi was a member of the "Yodogō Group" of the radical New Left Japan Communist League's "Red Army Faction" that carried out the hijacking of Japan Airlines Flight 351 in 1970, forcing the plane to fly to North Korea, which the hijackers had been led to believe was a socialist paradise. Wakabayashi currently resides in North Korea, along with other hijackers of the aircraft.

Early life and education
Wakabayashi was born in Kusatsu city, Shiga prefecture, Japan on February 26, 1947. After graduating from Shiga Prefectural Zeze High School, he enrolled in the Faculty of Economics at Dōshisha University in Kyoto, but participated in the hijacking and went into exile before graduating.

Music career
In 1967, Wakabayashi became a founding member of the pioneering Japanese noise rock band Les Rallizes Dénudés with fellow classmates at Dōshisha, serving as the band's first bassist. Takashi Mizutani, the leader of the band, was reportedly also offered a role in the hijacking, but turned it down. Participation in the hijacking marked Wakabayashi's departure from the band.

Hijacking
On March 31, 1970, Wakabayashi was one of nine hijackers who stormed the cockpit of Japan Airlines Flight 351, brandishing samurai swords and pipe bombs. At first they demanded to be flown to Cuba, where they expected to receive training as communist guerrilla soldiers. When the hijackers were informed that the Boeing 727 domestic flight did not have the range to fly to Cuba, they instead demanded to be flown to Pyongyang, North Korea. After stopping for refueling in the aircraft's original destination of Fukuoka, where some hostages were freed, the pilots then flew the plane to Seoul, South Korea, where the airport had been rigged to look like North Korea. However, the hijackers realized they were tricked after hearing American jazz music playing and finding no welcoming committee awaiting them, whereupon they finally secured passage to North Korea in exchange for releasing the remaining hostages. In North Korea, they were granted political asylum.

Later life
In 1976, while living in North Korea, Wakabayashi married fellow radical activist and political exile Sakiko Wakabayashi, with whom he had two children. In a March 2010 interview with Kyodo News, Wakabayashi stated that the hijacking was a "selfish and conceited" act. Wakabayashi added that he wished to return to Japan and was willing to face arrest and trial for his role in the hijacking. In April 2014 he was still alive, and residing in North Korea together with other members of his group.

References

Living people
1947 births
20th-century Japanese criminals
Fugitives wanted by Japan
Hijackers
Japanese communists
Japanese defectors
Japanese expatriates in North Korea
Japanese rock bass guitarists
Noise rock musicians
Psychedelic rock musicians
Protopunk musicians